Women's Giant Slalom World Cup 1991/1992

Final point standings

In Women's Giant Slalom World Cup 1991/92 all results count.

World Cup
FIS Alpine Ski World Cup women's giant slalom discipline titles